Devos the Devastator is a supervillain appearing in American comic books published by Marvel Comics. He is a foe of the Fantastic Four.  His first appearance was in Fantastic Four #359 (December, 1991); he was created by Tom DeFalco, Paul Ryan and Danny Bulanadi.

Fictional character biography
Devos is an extraterrestrial vigilante dedicated to bringing peace to the universe, but holds the rather warped view that this can only be done by destroying anyone whom he deems a threat to galactic peace—therefore, killing everyone capable of waging war. While Devos is willing to make alliances with other villains in order to further his goals, he inevitably betrays his allies (as they too are capable of waging war).

In his first appearance, he battled the Fantastic Four, then fled in his escape craft while his starship was destroyed. He then encountered and joined forces with Paibok the Power Skrull. He watched Paibok alter Lyja's genetic structure, then arrived on Earth with Paibok. He joined Paibok and Lyja the Lazerfist in an attack on the Human Torch in New York City.

His most notable act is probably his destruction of the Skrull Throneworld, throwing the Skrull Empire into civil war.

Devos later reappears in the Annihilation miniseries in the pages of Ronan. On the planet Godthab Omega, he was attacked by Talos the Untamed and later captured by Glorian. Devos conferred with Talos, who realized that Glorian was the one-time pupil of the Shaper of Worlds. When the planet was overrun by the Annihilation Wave, Glorian was distracted, releasing Devos and Talos. Ronan ordered the two of them to the spaceport to get off-planet with any other survivors.

Powers, abilities, and equipment
Devos wears an armored battlesuit that granted him tremendous strength and physical resistance. The suit is equipped with an energy blaster with automated targeting devices mounted on his right shoulder. It can fire projectiles with bazooka force from either shoulder, as well as poison gases or frost grenades via left wrist device and emit powerful electric shocks inside the outer surface of his armor. His helmet is also equipped with sophisticated internal sensor systems, designed to allow him see into otherwise invisible portions of the spectrum. It contains a "Luminator", which produces blinding lights. The anti-gravity generators in his exoskeleton enables him to fly at subsonic speeds.

The Arsenal Planet
Devos has access to numerous space vessels, advanced weaponry, and robotic servants, including Sedators (warrior robots), Servo-bots (robots capable of performing maintenance work aboard Devos's starship), and Bouncer-Bots (large humanoid units built to handle and capture specimens for study).

In other media
Devos the Devastator appears in the Moon Girl and Devil Dinosaur episode "The Borough Bully", voiced by Fred Tatasciore. This version speaks in third person.

References

External links
 
 Devos at Marvel.com

Characters created by Tom DeFalco
Comics characters introduced in 1991
Fictional characters with electric or magnetic abilities
Fictional characters with slowed ageing
Fictional characters with superhuman durability or invulnerability
Fictional cyborgs
Marvel Comics characters with superhuman strength
Marvel Comics aliens
Marvel Comics cyborgs
Marvel Comics extraterrestrial supervillains
Marvel Comics male supervillains
Marvel Comics supervillains